was a Japanese Vice Admiral of the First Sino-Japanese War and the Russo-Japanese War. He commanded the  during the Battle of Korsakov and the Battle of Tsushima.

Biography
Takenaka was born on 1864 at Anai Village, Aki District, Tosa Province (now Aki City). His father, Takehide, was a yakuyaku in Akimachi during the old clan era. He studied under Kusukichi Funamoto at Shingi Gakusha and graduated from the Imperial Japanese Naval Academy as part of its tenth class in October 1883 and became an assistant lieutenant in the navy. In April 1886, he was appointed as an ensign.

During the First Sino-Japanese War, he went to war as a squad leader of the Chiyoda. In July 1896, he became Gunnery Chief of the Zhenyuan and after working as Deputy Commander of the Pingyuan. In December 1897, he was promoted to Lieutenant Commander of the Navy and was appointed to the Asama and sent to the United Kingdom as part of a business trip. After working as chief of gunnery at the Asama, he was promoted to Commander in October 1898.

In December 1898, he assumed the post of Military Construction Supervisor and successively served as vice-commander of the Suma , Naniwa and Yakumo. He then took up the role of a marine artillery instructor, marine inspector general, Kure Naval Base outfitting committee, etc. on 1903. In October, he assumed the post of captain of Tsushima. She took part in the Battle of Korsakov and the Battle of Tsushima. In January 1905, he was promoted to captain. In August of the same year, he assumed the post of captain of Naniwa, and thereafter served as captain of the Kasuga, Yakumo, Suwo, and Suzuya.

In December 1910, he was promoted to Rear Admiral and assumed the post of Commander of the Chinkai Guard District and Head of the Temporary Building Department Branch. Since then, he has served as commander of the Kure Reserve Fleet and commander of the Kure Naval Base Fleet in December 1913. On December 1, 1914, he was promoted to Vice Admiral and at the same time, was transferred to the reserves. He died on December 11, 1919, while living at Tokyo.

Awards
Order of the Golden Kite, 4th Class
Order of the Rising Sun, 3rd Class with golden rays and neck ribbon

Court Ranks
July 8, 1886: Junior Eighth
December 16, 1891: Junior Seventh
October 31, 1898: Junior Sixth
March 1, 1909: Senior Fifth
March 10, 1914: Junior Fourth
January 11, 1915: Senior Fourth

References

1864 births
1919 deaths
People from Kōchi Prefecture
People of Meiji-period Japan
Imperial Japanese Navy admirals
Imperial Japanese Naval Academy alumni
Japanese military personnel of the First Sino-Japanese War
Japanese military personnel of the Russo-Japanese War
Recipients of the Order of the Golden Kite
Recipients of the Order of the Rising Sun, 3rd class